Newtowne Football Club is an intermediate-level football club from Limavady, County Londonderry, playing in the Premier Division of the Ballymena & Provincial League in Northern Ireland.

Honours

Intermediate honours
Ballymena & Provincial Football League: 2
2012–13, 2015–16

References

External links
 nifootball.co.uk - (For fixtures, results and tables of all Northern Ireland amateur football leagues)

Association football clubs in Northern Ireland
Association football clubs in County Londonderry
Limavady